Louis de Luxembourg may refer to:

 Louis II de Luxembourg (died 1443), Archbishop of Rouen and Bishop of Ely
 Louis de Luxembourg, Count of Saint-Pol (1418–1475)
 Louis de Luxembourg (born 1986), third son of Henri, Grand Duke of Luxembourg